Napaea is a genus in the butterfly family Riodinidae present only in the Neotropical realm.

Napaea contains strong butterflies with a robust body. The margin of the forewings is not projecting so far, the apex not so very falcate (sickle shaped), the costal of the forewing is not connected with the subcostal. They have a distinctive pattern of metallic blue or white or yellow comma-shaped marks, chevrons or punctiform spots, although in some species the markings are greatly reduced. They found in primary and degraded forest. The butterflies perch with the wings outspread in bushes near the skirts of the forests, out of which they may be beaten. They are not common.

Taxonomy
Now includes Cremna.

Species
Napaea agroeca Stichel, 1910 present in Brazil
Napaea beltiana (Bates, 1867) present in French Guiana, Guyana, Suriname, Colombia and Brazil
Napaea danforthi Warren & Opler, 1999 present in Mexico
Napaea elisae (Zikán, 1952) present in Brazil
Napaea eucharila (Bates, 1867) present in Mexico, Costa Rica, Panama, French Guiana, Suriname and Brazil
Napaea gynaecomorpha Hall, Harvey & Gallard, 2005
Napaea merula (Thieme, 1907) present in Ecuador
Napaea melampia (Bates, 1867) present in Brazil
Napaea neildi Hall & Willmott, 1998 present in Ecuador
Napaea nepos (Fabricius, 1793) present in French Guiana, Guyana, Paraguay and Peru
Napaea orpheus (Westwood, 1851) present in French Guiana and Brazil
Napaea paupercula Zikán, 1952 present in Brazil
Napaea phryxe (C. & R. Felder, 1865) present in Brazil
Napaea sylva (Möschler, 1877) present in French Guiana, Guyana and Suriname
Napaea tanos Stichel, 1910 present in Bolivia
Napaea theages (Godman & Salvin, 1878) present in Panama, Nicaragua, Costa Rica, Colombia and Ecuador
Napaea tumbesia Hall & Lamas, 2001 present in Peru
Napaea umbra (Boisduval, 1870) present in Mexico and Brazil
Napaea zikani Stichel, 1923 present in Brazil

Sources
Napaea sur funet

External links

Napaea at Butterflies of America
images representing Chorinea at Encyclopedia of Life
images representing Napaea at Consortium for the Barcode of Life

Riodinidae
Butterfly genera
Taxa named by Jacob Hübner